A'Rosa Cruises is a cruise line based in Rostock, Germany, which operates river cruises in Germany.

History
A'Rosa was established in 2001, as a subsidiary of P&O Princess Cruises. The company was created to serve the German cruise market, alongside the AIDA Cruises fleet, which had been acquired by P&O in 1999. A'Rosa was modeled loosely on the AIDA concept and began life with three ships. A'Rosa Blu, was the sole cruise ship of the fleet, accompanied by A'Rosa Bella and A'Rosa Donna, two newly built river cruise ships. In 2003, P&O Princess merged with Carnival Corporation to form Carnival Corporation & plc. The A'Rosa brand was sold soon after the merger and was purchased by a private company which owned A-ROSA Flussschiff. The company continues to operate river cruises on the Danube, Main, Mosel, Rhine, Rhône and Saône rivers.

A'Rosa Cruises Fleet

Current Fleet

Former Fleet

References

External links
 

Companies based in Mecklenburg-Western Pomerania
Cruise lines
River cruise companies
Economy of Rostock